Chai nenesi (Old Turkic: 𐰲𐰴𐰀𐰃:𐰤𐰤𐰾𐰃), is a name applied to Turkic spirits of water, commonly creeks. She is responsible for sucking people into swamps and lakes as well as killing the animals standing near the still waters.

She is described as a white nude female with tousled [hair] and is known to harass people and bring misfortune to drunkards. In most versions, Chai Nenesi is an unquiet being, associated with the "unclean force". She Usually comes out of the water at night to climb a tree and sing songs or sit on a dock and comb her hair.

Neighboring cultures
The same creature is important in the mythology of the Komi people. She supposedly lives in the Kama River and often goes to the shore to comb her hair. Everybody who sees her will soon drown or die by another cause.

In Slavic mythology its name is Rusalka. Rusalka is a female ghost, water nymph, succubus, or mermaid-like demon that dwelt in a waterway. Though in some versions of the myth, their eyes shine like green fire, others describe them with extremely pale and translucent skin, and no visible pupils. Her hair is sometimes depicted as green or golden, and often perpetually wet. The Rusalka could not live long on dry land, but with her comb she was always safe, for it gave her the power to conjure water when she needed it. According to some legends, should the rusalka's hair dry out, she will die.

References

External links 
 Türk Mitoloji Sözlüğü, Pınar Karaca

See also
 Su iyesi
 Rusalka

Turkic legendary creatures